Crosscountry is an educational simulation software series of programs for North American students (grade one through grade nine). Many schools use these games as a fun way to teach their students about the states, provinces, territories, and cities. The game is published by Ingenuity Works, a Vancouver-based company originally known as Didatech Software.

In most of the games, the player will drive an 18-wheeler to pick up and deliver commodities to the cities assigned, while making decisions about the best route, when to eat, sleep, fill up gas, etc. In the game series, the player will play as a truck driver where they will make the most money if beneficial decisions are made during their assignment.

Crosscountry USA (1985)
This was the first game in the series, released in 1985 by Didatech Software (later renamed to Ingenuity Works). Educational Software Reviews deemed it "the type of game you can play for a full hour without getting tired." Developed for the PC, the purpose of the game is to pick up commodities from one city and deliver them to another by driving across the country. Players interacted with the game through a command line using commands such as "turn on truck".

Crosscountry Canada (1986)
This was the second game in the series, released in 1986 for the Apple II by Didatech Software, and later ported to DOS in 1991. It was also ported to the ICON, the made-in-Canada educational computer platform. Home of the Underdogs deemed Crosscountry Canada "One of the best edutainment titles ever made". This title has since been made available on several websites, free-to-play.

Crosscountry California (1987)
As titled, players of this game are restricted to the boundaries of California. The gameplay was similar to Crosscountry USA.

Crosscountry Texas (1987) 
The game was the first geography simulation to be designed specifically for Texas schools. The game contained simulated travel from city to city throughout Texas. The game sees players  travel to 135 cities and collect up to 55 commodities; the game requires 128K to run, and the school version includes a back-up disk and a teacher 's manual. This version was created without the state's involvement, similar to California, and in contrast to North Dakota. According to Paul Melhus, president of Didatech, the simulation of Texas was designed to be as realistic as possible. The game was not used in Del Rio, as school officials noted the limited use of computers within education. The title was released onto DOS and the Apple II. The paper Technology: Window to the Future. Proceedings of the Annual State Conference of the Texas Computer Education Association noted that the game was more attractive to Texan teachers than Crosscountry USA due to the "proximity and familiarity with the content".

Crosscountry North Dakota (1992) 
In October 1992, Didatech announced a deal with North Dakota's Department of Public Instruction to create a state-specific version of the software for the state's schools. The state would provide statistical data to adapt Cross Country USA to a North Dakotan edition. Didatech estimated a production schedule of 100 hours, much quicker than the year taken for the USA version. This came off the heels of the targeted versions Canada, California, and Texas. The game was unique in that Didatech worked with the state's officials directly in production, while the Texas and Californian versions were created without the states' input. At the time of the announcement, Didatech was arranging deals similar to the North Dakotan one with Illinois, Virginia, Ontario, and British Columbia. the game was released onto the Apple II, while a DOS version was being worked on for release the following year. The Computer Paper felt the project "makes the most of what the small firm has".

That game had turned out to be cost-effective; the state invested $45,000 and supplied information for the software maker to use, while Didatech produced the game and manual. Didatech sold a school version of the software to the state, which then sold it directly to schools; meanwhile Didatech would sell a separate retail version through its traditional retail channels. The cost per school was only $65, verses $350 for the site license of a national title. Didatech president Paul Melhus asserted that this type of collaboration was better suited to smaller states due to them being less bureaucratic, more flexible, and more open to innovation.

This formula was later followed with Where in North Dakota Is Carmen Sandiego?.

Crosscountry Canada Platinum (2000)
The game was added to incorporate the new territory of Nunavut and the Confederation Bridge in Prince Edward Island.

Crosscountry USA 2 (2002)
The game was released in 2002, by Ingenuity Works.

Crosscountry Canada 2 (2002)

This game was released in 2002, by Ingenuity Works. Players drive an 18-wheeler truck picking up and delivering commodities across Canada while learning about provinces, cities, territories and more. Making wise decisions along the way will result in a successful trip. It features different large cities throughout Canada, and is an on-rails driving game.

Crosscountry USA Photo Safari (2002)
This game was released in 2002, by Ingenuity Works. The game is "much like Crosscountry USA 2 but with a focus on animals rather than commodities".

Crosscountry Canada Photo Safari (2002)
This game was released in 2002, by Ingenuity Works. The game is "much like Crosscountry Canada 2 but with a focus on animals rather than commodities".

Crosscountry BC (2002)
This game was released in 2002, by Ingenuity Works. As titled, players in this game are restricted to the boundaries of the Canadian province of British Columbia (BC).

References

15. ^ http://ingenuityworks.com/news/20060801.pdf

Notes
 Middle School Journal, 1994
 The Software Catalog: Microcomputers, 1987

External links
 Ingenuity Works
 
 Crosscountry series at MobyGames
 Crosscountry USA at GameFAQs
 Crosscountry Canada at GameFAQs
 Crosscountry Canada (1986) at Archive.org
 Crosscountry Canada (1991) at Archive.org
 Crosscountry Canada (1991) at ClassicReload

Apple II games
DOS games
Educational video games
Linux games
Classic Mac OS games
North America-exclusive video games
Truck racing video games
Video game franchises
Video game franchises introduced in 1985
Video games developed in Canada
Video games set in Canada
Video games set in the United States
Windows games